Virginia's 89th House of Delegates district elects one of 100 seats in the Virginia House of Delegates, the lower house of the state's bicameral legislature. District 89, consisting of parts of Norfolk, Virginia, is currently represented by Democrat Jackie Glass.

Elections 
District 89 was represented by Daun Hester from 2013, after she won a 2012 special election. In 2017, Hester stepped down to run for Norfolk City Treasurer, and Jerrauld "Jay" Jones (son of Jerrauld C. Jones, who held the seat for eight terms) ran for the seat. Joe Dillard, president of the Norfolk NAACP, also ran, as did Libertarian Terry Hurst.

In 2021, following the announcement that Jay Jones and his wife are expecting their first child in summer 2022, he resigned. Jackie Glass won the special election for the seat.

District officeholders

References

Norfolk, Virginia
Virginia House of Delegates districts